This is a bibliography of works on the military history of Canada.

Overviews

 
 
  historiography
 
 
 
 
 
 
 
 
 
 
 
 
 
 
 

Official accounts – National Defence and the Canadian Forces
 
 
 
 
  Also at Canada.ca

To 1914

 
 
 Baugh, D.A. The Global Seven Years War 1754–1763: Britain and France in a Great Power Contest (2011)
 Berton, Pierre. The Invasion of Canada, 1812–1813. McClelland and Stewart Ltd., 1980. 
 Berton, Pierre. Flames Across the Border, 1813–1814. McClelland and Stewart Ltd., 1981. 
 Boulton, Charles A. (1886) Reminiscences of the North-West Rebellions. Toronto.
 Brumwell, Stephen. 
 
 
 Choquette, Leslie. Frenchmen into peasants : modernity and tradition in the peopling of French Canada. Cambridge, MA : Harvard University Press, 1997. ISBN
 Cave, Alfred A. (2004), The French and Indian war, Greenwood Press 
 
 
 
 
 
 
 
 Hunt, George T. (1972), The wars of the Iroquois, University of Wisconsin Press 
 
 
 
 Pederson, Charles E.  (2010), The French & Indian War, ABDO 
 Senior, H. (1996). The last invasion of Canada: The Fenian raids, 1866–1870. Dundurn Press. 
 Sheppard, Ruth (2006), Empires Collide: The French and Indian War 1754-63, Osprey 
 Reid, John G. (2004). The "conquest" of Acadia, 1710: imperial, colonial, and aboriginal constructions,  University of Toronto Press 
 Ross, David (1992), Canadian Campaigns, 1860–1870, pub Osprey, 
 
 
 Wrong, George M. (1968). Canada and the American Revolution: The Disruption of the First British Empire, Rowman & Littlefield Publishers.
 Wrong, George M. and Langton, H.H. (1914) The Chronicles of Canada: Volume II – The Rise of New France Fireship Press (2009),

1914 to 1945

First World War

 ,
 Armstrong, John Griffith (2002) The Halifax Explosion and the Royal Canadian Navy: Inquiry and Intrigue, UBC Press.
 
 
 
 Bechthold, Michael (2007), Vimy Ridge : a Canadian reassessment, Wilfrid Laurier University Press 
 Berton P. Vimy. McClelland and Stewart Ltd. 1986. 
 
 
 Cook, Tim. Warlords: Borden, Mackenzie King and Canada's World Wars (2012) 472pp  excerpt and text search
 
 Busch, Briton Cooper (2003), Canada and the Great War: Western Front Association papers,  McGill-Queen's University Press 
 Cassar, George H (2010),  Hell in Flanders Fields: Canadians at the Second Battle of Ypres, Dundurn Press 
 
 Cook, Tim (2007) At the Sharp End: Canadians Fighting the Great War, 1914–1916, Viking Canada 
 Cook, Tim (2008) Shock Troops: Canadians Fighting the Great War, 1917–1918, Viking Canada 
 Cook, Tim (2010) The Madman and the Butcher: The Sensational Wars of Sam Hughes and General Arthur Currie, Penguin Canada 
 
 
 
 Granatstein, J. L. (2004),  Hell's Corner: An Illustrated History of Canada's Great War, 1914–1918, Douglas & McIntyre 
 
 
 Kordan, Bohdan S. (2002), Enemy Aliens, Prisoners of War: Internment in Canada during the Great War, McGill-Queen's University Press 
 MacKenzie, David, ed. Canada and the First World War (2005) 16 essays by leading scholars
 Morton, D. and J. L. Granatstein. Marching to Armaggeddon – Canadians and the Great War 1914–1919. Lester & Dennys Ltd. 1989. 
 Morton, D. (1993).  When Your Number's Up – WWI, Random House of Canada 
 Perkins, Dave, "Canada's Submariners 1914–1923", Boston Mills Press, Erin, 1989, 
 Thompson, Julian, "The 1916 Experience:  Verdun and the Somme", Seven Oaks, London, 2006, 
 Turner, Alexander (2005), Vimy Ridge 1917: Byng's Canadians Triumph at Arras Osprey Publ 
 
 

Official accounts – National Defence and the Canadian Forces
 Brereton Greenhous; Stephen J. Harris (1992) Canada And The Battle Of Vimy Ridge, 9-12 April 1917 Minister Supply and Service (Downloadable PDF)  
 Duguid, A.F, (1938) Official History of the Canadian Forces in the Great War, 1914–1919, Vol I Part I King's Printer, Ottawa, (Downloadable PDF)
 Duguid, A.F, (1938) Official History of the Canadian Forces in the Great War, 1914–1919, Vol I Part 2 King's Printer, Ottawa, (Downloadable PDF)
 Nicholson, G.W.L. (1964) Official History of the Canadian Army in the First World War: Canadian Expeditionary Force, 1914–1919, Duhamel, Queen's Printer and Controller of Stationery, Ottawa (Downloadable PDF)
 Macphail, Sir Andrew (1925) Official History of the Canadian Forces in the Great War: The Medical Services, F.A. Acland, King's Printer, Ottawa  (Downloadable PDF)
 Ministry of Overseas Military Forces (1919) Report of the Ministry Overseas Military Forces of Canada – 1918, London : H.M. Stationery Office (Downloadable PDF)
 Snell, A.E. (1924) The C.A.M.C. with the Canadian Corps during the Last Hundred Days of the Great War, F.A. Acland, King's Printer, Ottawa (Downloadable PDF)

Spanish Civil War

 
 Zuehlke, Mark (1996) The Gallant Cause: Canadians in the Spanish Civil War, 1936–1939, Wiley & Sons Canada

Second World War

 Avery, Donald (1998), The science of war : Canadian scientists and allied  military technology during the Second World War, University of Toronto Press.
 Barris, Ted. Behind The Glory: The Plan that Won the Allied Air War. Markham, Ontario: Thomas Allen & Son Publishers, 2005. 
 Bashow, David L. All the Fine Young Eagles. Toronto: Stoddard, 1996, 
 
 
 
  on Canadian operations
 
 Bryden, John. Deadly Allies: Canada's Secret War 1937–1947 (McClelland & Stewart, Toronto, 1989.)
 Burrow, Len & Beaudoin, Emile, Unlucky Lady:  The Life and Death of HMCS Athabaskan (Toronto: M&S, 1987), 
 
 Cook, Tim. Warlords: Borden, Mackenzie King and Canada's World Wars (2012) 472pp  excerpt and text search
 
 Copp,  J. T (2006),  Cinderella army: the Canadians in northwest Europe, 1944–1945, University of Toronto Press 
 
 
 
 
 Coughlin, Tom. The Dangerous Sky: Canadian Airmen in World War II. The Ryerson Press, 1968. 
 Dickson, Paul Douglas. A Thoroughly Canadian General: A Biography of General H.D.G. Crerar (2007)  excerpt and text search
 Dunmore, Spencer, In Great Waters:  "The Epic Story of the Battle of the Atlantic 1939–1945 (Toronto: M&S, 1999) 
 English, John Alan (1991). The Canadian Army and the Normandy campaign: a study of failure in high command, Praeger, 
 
 Fowler, Robert  (1995) Valour in the victory campaign : the 3rd Canadian Infantry Division gallantry decorations, General Store Pub. House 
 Fraser, Doug, Postwar Casualty:  Canada's Merchant Navy (Pottersfield Press, Lawrencetown Beach, 1997), 
 
 Granatstein, J. L. and D. Morton. A Nation Forged in Fire. Lester & Orpen Dennys Ltd. 1989. 
  historiography
 Granatstein; J. L. The Generals: The Canadian Army's Senior Commanders in the Second World War (Don Mills, Ont.: Stoddart, 1993) , 
 
 Granatstein, J. L. (2005), The last good war : an illustrated history of Canada in the Second World War, 1939–1945, Douglas & McIntyre 
 Granatstein, J. L. Canada's War: The Politics of the Mackenzie King Government. Oxford UP, (1975).
 
 
 Greenhous, Harris, Johnston, & Rawling, "The Crucible of War 1939–1945:  The Official History of the Royal Canadian Air Force Volume 3", University of Toronto Press, Toronto, 1994, 
 Michael L. Hadley (1990),  U-Boats Against Canada: German Submarines in Canadian Waters, Mcgill Canada 
 Harbron, John D., "The Longest Battle:  The RCN in the Atlantic 1939–1945", Vanwell, St. Catherines, 1995
 Harvey, J. Douglas, "Boys, Bombs, and Brussels Sprouts", M&S, Halifax, 1982,  (RCAF No. 6 Group, Bomber Command)
 
 Hayes, Geoffrey et al. eds. Canada and the Second World War: Essays in Honour of Terry Copp (2012) specialized essays by scholars excerpt
 
 Keshen, Jeffrey A. Saints, Sinners, and Soldiers: Canada's Second World War (2004)
 Iarocci, Andrew (2008), Shoestring soldiers: the 1st Canadian Division at war, 1914–1915, University of Toronto Press 
 
 
 Kelsey, Marion (1997), Victory harvest: diary of a Canadian in the Women's Land Army, 1940–1944,  McGill-Queen's University Press 
 
 Knowles Middleton, W.E., Radar Development in Canada: The Radio Branch of the National Research Council of Canada, 1939–1946, Wilfrid Laurier University Press, Waterloo, Ontario, 1981.
 Lamb, James B., A Bloody War M&S, Toronto, 1990, 
 Lamb, James B. The Corvette War Signet Books, Scarborough, 1979, 
 Lamb, James B. On the Triangle Run (Totem, Toronto, 1987) 
 Lynch, Thomas G. Canada's Flowers:  History of the Corvettes of Canada Nimbus, Halifax, 1983, 
 Macpherson, Burgess. The Ships of Canada's Naval Forces 1910–1985 (Collins, Toronto, 1981)
 Macpherson, Ken, The River Class Destroyers of the Royal Canadian Navy Charles J. Mussen Publishers, Toronto, 1985, 
 McIntosh, Dave, "Terror in the Starboard Seat", PaperJacks, Markham, 1981,  (RCAF 418 Squadron Intruder ops)
 Morton, Desmond and Granatstein, J. L. Victory 1945, Phyllis Bruce books, Toronto, 1995, 
 
 
 Nadler, John (2006), A perfect hell : the forgotten story of the Canadian  commandos of the Second World War, Anchor Canada, 
 Peden, Murray (2003), Thousand shall fall : the true story of a Canadian bomber pilot in world war two, Dundurn Press 
 Pierson, Ruth Roach. Canadian Women and the Second World War. Ottawa: Canadian Historical Association, 1983. No ISBN
 Rickard, John. Politics of Command: Lieutenant-General A.G.L. McNaughton and the Canadian Army, 1939–1943 (2009)
 Robertson, Ian (2007), While bullets fly : the story of a Canadian field surgical unit in the Second World War, Trafford 
 Rogge, Robert E. (2005),  Fearsome battle: with the Canadian Army in World War II Europe, Camroc Press 
 Saunders, Tim  (2004), Juno Beach: 3rd Canadian & 79th armoured divisions,  McGill-Queen's University Press 
 
 Stacey, C. P. Arms, Men and Governments: The War Policies of Canada 1939–1945 (1970), the standard scholarly history of WWII policies; online free

 Toman, Cynthia (2007), An officer and a lady: Canadian military nursing and the Second World War, University of British Columbia Press 
 The Canadians at War 1939/45 Volume 1, Reader's Digest, Canada, 4th printing, 1976, SBN 0-88850-161-7
 The Canadians at War 1939/45 Volume 2, Reader's Digest, Canada, 4th printing, 1976, SBN 0-88850-161-7
 
 Whitton, Charlotte. Canadian Women in the War Effort. Toronto: The Macmillan company of Canada limited, 1942. No ISBN
 Ziegler, Mary. We Serve That Men May Fly – The Story of the Women's Division of the Royal Canadian Air Force. Hamilton: RCAF (WD) Association, 1973. No ISBN.
 Zuehlke, Mark (1999) Ortona: Canada's Epic World War II Battle,  Douglas & McIntyre 
 Zuehlke, Mark (2001) The Liri Valley: Canada's World War II Breakthrough to Rome, Douglas & McIntyre 
 Zuehlke, Mark (2003) The Gothic Line: Canada's Month of Hell in WWII Italy, Douglas & McIntyre 
 Zuehlke, Mark (2004) Juno Beach: Canada's D-Day Victory – June 6, 1944, Douglas & McIntyre 
 Zuehlke, Mark (2005) Holding Juno: Canada's Heroic Defence of the D-Day Beaches – June 7–12, 1944, Douglas & McIntyre 
 Zuehlke, Mark (2007) Terrible Victory : First Canadian Army and the Scheldt Estuary Campaign, September 13-November 6, 1944, Douglas & McIntyre 
 Zuehlke, Mark (2008) Operation Husky: The Canadian Invasion of Sicily, July 10–August 7, 1943, Douglas & McIntyre 
 Zuehlke, Mark (2010) On to Victory: The Canadian Liberation of the Netherlands, March 23–May 5, 1945, Douglas & McIntyre 
 Zuehlke, Mark (2011) Breakout from Juno: First Canadian Army and the Normandy Campaign – July 4–August 21, 1944, Douglas & McIntyre 
 
Official accounts – National Defence and the Canadian Forces
  Stacey, C P. (1948) The Canadian Army, 1939–1945 : An Official Historical Summary King's Printer, Ottawa (Downloadable PDF)
 Stacey, C P. (1970) Arms, Men and Governments: The War Policies of Canada, 1939–1945 Queen's Printer, Ottawa (Downloadable PDF)
  Stacey, C P. (1955) Official History of the Canadian Army in the Second World War, Vol I Six Years of War, Queen's Printer, Ottawa (Downloadable PDF)
  Nicholson, G. W. L. (1956)  Official history of the Canadian Army in  the Second World War, Vol II The Canadians in Italy, Queen's Printer, Ottawa (Downloadable PDF)
  Stacey, C P. (1960) Official History of the Canadian Army in the Second World War, Vol III The Victory Campaign: The Operations in Northwest Europe, 1944-45, Queen's Printer, Ottawa (Downloadable PDF)
 Feasby, W.R. (1956) Official History of the Canadian Medical Services, 1939–1945, Vol 1 Organization and Campaigns Queen's Printer, Ottawa (Downloadable PDF)
 McAndrew, Bill; Bill Rawling, Michael Whitby (1995) Liberation: The Canadians in Europe Art Global (Downloadable PDF)

1945 to present
 Kasurak, Peter. A National Force: The Evolution of Canada's Army, 1950–2000 (Vancouver: UBC Press, 2013)

Cold war

 
 Bashow, David L., "Starfighter: A Loving Retrospective of the CF-104 Era in Canadian Fighter Aviation 1961–1986", Fortress Publications, Toronto, 1990 
 
 
 
 Lynch, Thomas G., "The Flying 400:  Canada's Hydrofoil Project", Nimbus, Halifax, 1983, 
 Mills, Carl, "Banshees in the Royal Canadian Navy", Banshee Publication, Willowdale, 1991 
 
 Soward, Stuart E., "Hands to Flying Stations Volume 1:  A Recollective History of Canadian Naval Aviation 1945–1954", Neptune, Victoria, 1993,

Korean War

 Bercuson, David J. (1999) Blood on the Hills: The Canadian Army in the Korean War  University of Toronto Press, 
 
 
 Melady, John, "Korea:  Canada's Forgotten War", MacMillan, Toronto, 1983, 
 Meyers, Edward C., "Thunder in the Morning Calm", Vanwell Publishing, St. Catherines, 1992, 
Official accounts – National Defence and the Canadian Forces
 Historical Section General Staff, Army Headquarters (1956) Canada's Army in Korea: The United Nations Operations, 1950–53, and Their Aftermath Queen's Printer (Downloadable PDF)
 Wood, F.W (1966) Official History of the Canadian Army in Korea: Strange Battleground Queen's Printer, Ottawa (Downloadable PDF)
 Thorgrimmson, E.C. Russell (1956) Canadian Naval Operations in Korean Waters, 1950–1955 Naval Historical Section, Canadian Forces Headquarters, Ottawa (Downloadable PDF)

Rwanda

Congo

Yugoslav
 Gamme, Nicholas (2001) From peacekeeping to peacemaking: Canada's response to the Yugoslav crisis, McGill-Queen's University Press

Croatia

Somalia

Afghanistan

Nuclear weapons

Leaders
 Cook, Tim. Warlords: Borden, Mackenzie King and Canada's World Wars (2012) 472pp online, on the prime ministers in the world wars

 Horn, Bernd (2001) Warrior chiefs: perspectives on senior Canadian military leaders, Dundurn Press

Special forces

Aviation
 The Arrowheads, "Arrow:  The Story of the Avro Arrow from its Evolution to its Extinction", Boston Mills Press, Erin, 1980, 
 Barris, Ted. Behind The Glory: The Plan that Won the Allied Air War. Markham, Ontario: Thomas Allen & Son Publishers, 2005. 
 Bashow, David L., "All the Fine Young Eagles", Stoddard, Toronto, 1996, 
 Bashow, David L., "Starfighter: A Loving Retrospective of the CF-104 Era in Canadian Fighter Aviation 1961–1986", Fortress Publications, Toronto, 1990 
 
 Coughlin, Tom. The Dangerous Sky: Canadian Airmen in World War II. The Ryerson Press, 1968. 
 Deere, Captain David N. ed., "Desert Cats:  The Canadian Fighter Squadron in the Gulf War", Fortress Publications, Stoney Creek, 1991, 
 Dempsey, Daniel V. A Tradition of Excellence: Canada's Airshow Team Heritage. Victoria, BC: High Flight Enterprises, 2002. .
 Foster, J. A., "Sea Wings: A Pictorial History of Canada's Waterborne Defence Aircraft", Meuthen, Toronto, 1986, 
 
 
 Greenhous, Brereton; Halliday, Hugh A. Canada's Air Forces, 1914–1999. Montreal: Editions Art Global and the Department of National Defence, 1999. .
 Greenhous, Harris, Johnston, & Rawling, "The Crucible of War 1939–1945:  The Official History of the Royal Canadian Air Force Volume 3", University of Toronto Press, Toronto, 1994, 
 Hatch, F.J. Aerodrome of Democracy: Canada and the British Commonwealth Air Training Plan 1939–1945. Ottawa: Canadian Department of National Defence, 1983. 
 Milberry, Larry, ed. Sixty Years—The RCAF and CF Air Command 1924–1984. Toronto: Canav Books, 1984. 
 Milberry, Larry. Aviation in Canada: Evolution of an Air Force. Toronto: Canav Books, 2010. .
 Mills, Carl, "Banshees in the Royal Canadian Navy", Banshee Publication, Willowdale, 1991 
 
 
 Roberts, Leslie. There Shall Be Wings. Toronto: Clark, Irwin and Co. Ltd., 1959. No ISBN.
 Shores, Christopher, "History of the Royal Canadian Air Force", Royce Publishing, Toronto, 1984, 
 Soward, Stuart E., "Hands to Flying Stations Volume 1: A Recollective History of Canadian Naval Aviation 1945–1954", Neptune, Victoria, 1993,

Naval
 Arbuckle, J. Graeme, "Badges of the Canadian Navy", Nimbus, Halifax, 1987, 
 Burrow, Len & Beaudoin, Emile, "Unlucky Lady:  The Life and Death of HMCS Athabaskan", M&S, Toronto, 1987, 
 "Canada's Navy Annual", Corvus Publishing, Calgary, 1986
 Dunmore, Spencer, "In Great Waters:  "The Epic Story of the Battle of the Atlantic 1939–1945", M&S, Toronto, 1999, 
 Foster, J. A., "Sea Wings: A Pictorial History of Canada's Waterborne Defence Aircraft", Meuthen, Toronto, 1986, 
 Fraser, Doug, "Postwar Casualty: Canada's Merchant Navy", Pottersfield Press, Lawrencetown Beach, 1997, 
 
 Hadley, Michael L.,  U-Boats Against Canada: German Submarines in Canadian Waters, Mcgill Canada, 1990 
 Harbron, John D., "The Longest Battle:  The RCN in the Atlantic 1939–1945", Vanwell, St. Catherines, 1995
 Johnston, Mac (2008). Corvettes Canada: Convoy Veterans of WWII Tell Their True Stories. Wiley. .
 Lamb, James B., "A Bloody War", M&S, Toronto, 1990, 
 Lamb, James B., "The Corvette War", Signet Books, Scarborough, 1979, 
 Lamb, James B., "On the Triangle Run", Totem, Toronto, 1987, 
 Lynch, Thomas G. "Canada's Flowers:  History of the Corvettes of Canada", Nimbus, Halifax, 1983, 
 Lynch, Thomas G., "The Flying 400:  Canada's Hydrofoil Project", Nimbus, Halifax, 1983, 
 Macpherson, Ken, "The River Class Destroyers of the Royal Canadian Navy", Charles J. Mussen Publishers, Toronto, 1985, 
 Macpherson, Ken & Burgess, John, "The Ships of Canada's Naval Forces 1910–1993", Vanwell, St. Catherines, 1994, 
 Mills, Carl, "Banshees in the Royal Canadian Navy", Banshee Publication, Willowdale, 1991 
 
 Perkins, Dave, "Canada's Submariners 1914–1923", Boston Mills Press, Erin, 1989, 
 Schull, Joseph. Ships of the Great Days: Canada's Navy in World War II, in series, Great Stories of Canada. Macmillan, Toronto, 1962. 156 p., ill.
 Snowie, J. Allen, "The Bonnie:  HMCS Bonaventure", Boston Mills Press, Erin, 1987, 
 Soward, Stuart E., "Hands to Flying Stations Volume 1:  A Recollective History of Canadian Naval Aviation 1945–1954", Neptune, Victoria, 1993,

Academies and museums

Law

Orders, decorations, and medals

See also

 Military history of Canada References
 Bibliography of Canada
 Canadian military victories
 History of the Royal Canadian Navy
 History of the Canadian Army
 History of the Royal Canadian Air Force
 List of conflicts in Canada
 List of Canadian military operations
 List of Canadian Peacekeeping Missions
 Military history of Canada
 Victoria Cross (Canada)
 Lists of books
 List of bibliographies

External links
 Canadian Military History Gateway – Government of Canada
 Canadian Military History – Library and Archives Canada
 Canadian Military History – Wilfrid Laurier University
 War and the Foundation of Canada – Canadian War Museum
 CBC Archives (War & Conflict) – Canadian Broadcasting Corporation
 A Bibliography of Regimental and Military Histories and Relative Material – University of Calgary Library (2003)

 
Canadian Military
Historiography of the British Empire